Events from the year 1858 in China.

Incumbents 
 Xianfeng Emperor (9th year)

Events 
 Nian Rebellion
 Second Opium War
 Taiping Rebellion
 Battle of Sanhe
 Miao Rebellion (1854–73)
 Amur Annexation
 Treaty of Aigun,  unequal treaty between the Russian Empire, and the empire of the Qing Dynasty that reversing the Treaty of Nerchinsk (1689) by transferring the land between the Stanovoy Mountains and the Amur River from China (Qing Empire) to the Russian Empire establishing much of the modern border between the Russian Far East and Manchuria (the original homeland of the Manchu people and the Qing Dynasty), which is now known as Northeast China.
 Panthay Rebellion
 Loke Yew leaves China for British Malaya
 Opium is legalized

Deaths 
 Li Xubin, Xiang Army commander killed in the Battle of Sanhe

References